Princess Sophia may refer to:

People

Great Britain
Princess Sophia of the United Kingdom, a daughter of George III of the United Kingdom
Princess Sophia of Gloucester, a great granddaughter of George II of Great Britain
Sophia Dorothea of Hanover, a daughter of George I of Great Britain
Sophia of Hanover, mother of George I of Great Britain, and Electress of Hanover
Sophia Dorothea of Celle, wife of George I of Great Britain

Germany
Sophia of Prussia, wife of Constantine I of Greece, Sister of Wilhelm II, Granddaughter of Queen Victoria

Russia
Sophia Alekseyevna, regent of Russia during the early years of Peter the Great

Spain
Queen Sofia of Spain, daughter of Paul I of Greece; wife of Juan Carlos I of Spain
Infanta Sofia of Spain, daughter of the Prince and Princess of Asturias, granddaughter of King Juan Carlos I of Spain and his wife, Queen Sofia

Sweden
Princess Sofia, Duchess of Värmland wife of Prince Carl Philip, Duke of Värmland

Other
SS Princess Sophia, a steamer which sank off the southwestern coast of Alaska, killing all on board

See also
Sofia the First, a Disney series about a princess named Sofia

Sophia